The Altdorf–Flüelen tramway (AF) was a metre gauge electric tramway in the Swiss canton of Uri. It linked the town of Altdorf with Flüelen, terminating adjacent to Flüelen station on the Gotthard railway.

The tramway was opened in 1906, and closed in 1951, being replaced by a bus service. The line was electrified at 600 V DC.

The only visible remains of line is the tram depot, on the outskirts of Altdorf. After closure of the tramway, this was used as a bus depot by the Auto AG Uri until they moved to new premises in 2009.

References 

Altdorf–Flüelen tramway
Closed railway lines in Switzerland
Metre gauge railways in Switzerland
Tram transport in Switzerland
Transport in the canton of Uri
Railway lines opened in 1906
Railway lines closed in 1951
1906 establishments in Switzerland